Poul Hansen (1913–1966) was a Danish Minister of Defence and Minister of Finance.

Poul Hansen may also refer to:

 Poul Hansen (football manager) (born 1953), Danish top-flight football (soccer) manager
 Poul L. Hansen (1916–2002), Danish international football (soccer) player
 Poul Hansen (sport wrestler) (1891–1948), Danish Olympic silver medalist sport wrestler
 Poul Hansen Egede (1708–1789), Danish-Norwegian missionary to Greenland
 Poul Hansen (mayor) (1922–2017), Danish mayor

See also 
 Paul Hanson (disambiguation)